Tabane may refer to:
 Philip Tabane (1934–2018), South African musician
 Tabane, Central African Republic